The Canadian Journal of Forest Research is a peer-reviewed scientific journal published by NRC Research Press. It covers research related to forest resource management, including forest biology, biometry, conservation, economics, genetics, human dimensions, management, operations, protection, policy, remote sensing, soils, silviculture, wildlife and wood science. The journal publishes articles, reviews, notes, and commentaries. The journal was established in 1971 and published quarterly till 1982. From 1983 till 1986 it a published bimonthly and since 1987 it is published monthly.

The editors-in-chief are S. Ellen Macdonald and Sylvie Gauthier.

The Canadian Journal of Forest Research was selected as one of the DBIO 100, the 100 most influential journals in biology and medicine over the last 100 years as voted by the BioMedical & Life Sciences Division of the Special Libraries Association on the occasion of its centennial.

See also 
 List of forestry journals

References

External links 
 

Forestry journals
Publications established in 1971
Canadian Science Publishing academic journals
Forestry in Canada